"If It Rains" is a song written by Kiki Dee and recorded by New Zealand-born singer songwriter, Mark Williams. The song was released in April 1976 as the second and final single from his second studio album, Sweet Trials (1976). The song peaked at number 25 on the New Zealand charts.

Reception
In an album review from Victoria University of Wellington by Suedo Nim, Nim said; "Kiki Dee's "If It Rains", one of the three foreign tracks on the album, is performed convincingly with strong vocal backings."

Track listing
 7" single (EMI – HR 550)
Side A: "If It Rains"
Side B: "Morning Sun Upon a Mountain"

Chart performance

References

1976 singles
1975 songs
Mark Williams (singer) songs
EMI Records singles